William Carmichael may refer to:
 William Carmichael (solicitor general), Solicitor General for Scotland 1701–09
 William Carmichael (diplomat) (1739–1795), American statesman and diplomat
 William Carmichael (bishop) (1702–1765), Archbishop of Dublin, 1765
Neil Carmichael (English politician) (William Neil Carmichael)